The Partnership High School for Law, Democracy, and Civic Engagement is a collaboration among the School District of Philadelphia, the National Constitution Center, and the Gilder Lehrman Institute of American History. The school will be opening in the Fall of 2006. The school's first principal is Tom Davidson. The school is now open to 10th and 9th grades and every year they will add a grade.

The school is located at 18 S. 7th Street in center city Philadelphia, PA, only a couple blocks away from Independence Hall, the Constitution Center, and the Federal 3rd Circuit Court of Appeals. By engaging students with an appreciation for history and an understanding of the democratic principles embodied in the U.S. Constitution, this college preparatory high school's goal is to develop the next generation of engaged citizens and civic leaders in government, public policy, and law.

Educational institutions established in 2006
Public high schools in Pennsylvania
2006 establishments in Pennsylvania